Helen Zahavi (born 1966) is an English novelist and screenwriter born and educated in London. Her father was sent to Britain with the Polish Army in the Second World War, while her mother's parents came from Odessa. Before becoming a writer, Zahavi worked as a Russian translator. She has spent several years in Paris.

Dirty Weekend
Zahavi's first novel, Dirty Weekend (1991), caused a media storm on publication: critical reaction was extreme and polarised. A half-page article in The Sunday Times questioning the book's morality and the author's sanity set the tone for much of the press comment that followed. The book was attacked by Salman Rushdie, defended by Naomi Wolf, and analysed at length in both the broadsheet and popular press. Despite initial media hostility, the book went on to be a strong seller in the UK and in Europe. 

Dirty Weekend has been translated into 13 languages, including Chinese, Japanese, Czech and Korean. It was shortlisted for the Whitbread First Novel Award and adapted as a film by Michael Winner, the director of Death Wish. Zahavi has a screen credit as co-writer and appeared with Winner on an edition of the Channel 4 discussion programme After Dark alongside, among others, the father of the so-called Yorkshire Ripper.

Zahavi has written three further novels – True Romance (1994) Donna and the Fatman (1998), and Brighton Boy (2013) – which have been widely reviewed and translated. Covers of English and foreign-language editions of the author's books also appear there.

Awards and nominations
Dirty Weekend was shortlisted for the Whitbread First Novel Award in 1991.

Bibliography
Dirty Weekend (Macmillan, 1991). 
True Romance (Secker & Warburg, 1994). 
Donna and the Fatman (Anchor, 1998). 
Brighton Boy (Bestseller Books, 2013).

References

External links

Interview with Gerald Jacobs – The Independent on Sunday
Noir Transformations:  Gender, Place and Identity in The Talented Mr Ripley and Dirty Weekend – Andrew Jeffcoat, Lancaster University/[Crimeculture.com]
Interview with Alex Kershaw  – Tribune Magazine
Sauve Qui Peut Zahavi – François Rivière, Libération

1966 births
Living people
20th-century English novelists
21st-century English novelists
English people of Polish descent 
English people of Russian descent